Supremo is a remote desktop software that allows access to remote computers, servers and other devices. It was first released in 2013 by Nanosystems S.r.l.

It runs on Windows, macOS, Android, Linux, and iOS operating systems.

Software 
Supremo's main function is enabling users to remotely access computers from desktop and mobile devices. It can be used without configuration or installation procedures.

Use by hackers and scammers 
Supremo has been abused by hackers and scammers to gain access to the victim's computers. Supremo attempts to combat this by putting a warning message at the first start of the software.

Features 
If desired, Supremo can start at the system boot of devices to allow unattended access on the remote machines.

References 

2013 software
Remote administration software
Remote administration software for Linux
MacOS remote administration software
Windows remote administration software